I'd Do Anything is a 2008 talent show-themed television series produced by the BBC in the United Kingdom and broadcast on BBC One. It premièred on 15 March 2008. The show centred on a search for a new, unknown lead to play Nancy and three young performers who would play Oliver Twist in the 2009 West End revival of the British musical Oliver!.

The show, named after the Oliver! song "I'd Do Anything", was hosted by Graham Norton with Andrew Lloyd Webber again overseeing the programme, together with theatrical producer Cameron Mackintosh. In January 2008, John Barrowman confirmed he would be taking part in the show. The BBC also confirmed in late February 2008 that Barry Humphries would join Barrowman and Denise Van Outen (who was previously the presenter of the US Broadway reality show Grease: You're the One that I Want!) on the judging panel of the show.

Auditions for the show began in January 2008, with the show airing on BBC One throughout March, April and May 2008. In the final, on 31 May, Jodie Prenger was announced as the winner of the series.

Format
Commissioned after the success of the two similar BBC series How Do You Solve A Problem Like Maria? and Any Dream Will Do, the series followed the same format to find a new unknown lead, but with two roles rather than one as in the previous two series. However, whilst the format for the Nancy was the same with the public choosing the winner, the three boys who will play the part of Oliver were chosen by the judging panel.

Criteria
Auditions took place in 2008; in Belfast on 24 January, Manchester on 26–27 January, London from 1 to 3 February and Glasgow on 6 February with auditions for both parts taking place at the same venues and dates.

Nancy
For the role of Nancy applicants needed to be aged 17 or over on 1 January 2008, with the playing age being 17–35. Entry was open to both amateur and professional performers. Stages one and two were the same as for the part of Oliver. At stage three though, the call-backs took place between 16 and 18 February when the show's panel interviewed the auditionees. There were then workshops and final audition performances between 21 and 26 February; and throughout mid-March, April and May for the television show. The "Nancys" had to impress the panel in the first two shows and, from programme three, they also had to gain viewer support to stay in with a chance of winning the role of Nancy.

Oliver
For the role of Oliver applicants needed to be at least nine on 1 January 2008 and no older than 14 on 31 December 2008 with the part of Oliver being from nine to twelve years old. The auditions were in two stages. Those who made it through to the second stage were filmed and then twelve young performers went through to stage three, the live television show where each week they learned a piece to perform on the show. Eight boys went through to the semi-final. Three boys were then chosen in the final stage, with one of the final three performing at the press night of Oliver! Following expert advice in providing a duty of care to child contributors, the BBC announced on 13 March that the boys would not face a public vote, and that each week the "Olivers" would be performing musical tasks, learning the tricks of the theatre trade and also perform as a group, before the judging panel make their final choices.

Auditions
The first programme, which aired on 15 March, charted the journeys of thousands of auditionees as they begin their quest for stardom in the regional auditions.

For the role of Nancy, just over a hundred young women were called to London to perform before the panel, consisting of John Barrowman, Denise Van Outen and David Grindrod. Those who stood out then had the chance to win a place at Nancy School, the next stage in the competition. For the role of Oliver, fifty young boys were selected to work with musical theatre experts before the final twelve were chosen for the live shows by Andrew Lloyd Webber and Cameron Mackintosh.

The second programme, which aired on 22 March, focussed mainly on the 42 women at Nancy School and the procedure of finding the final twelve women to compete in the weekly live show for the part of Nancy. The twelve boys who will compete on the live show for the part of Oliver were also introduced throughout the programme.

Weekly format
Saturday - Live
The show opens with a group number by the Nancys and Olivers. Each Nancy then performs a song, with feedback provided by the panel and Lloyd Webber. The public votes for the contestant they wish to keep in the show. Voting closes shortly after the broadcast of the Saturday programme.

Footage of the Olivers' progress is shown, during which Andrew Lloyd Webber and Cameron Mackintosh select one to proceed through to the semi-final.

Sunday - Recorded after live show on Saturdays.
The Oliver who was announced as a semi-finalist takes the lead with the other Olivers in a song. After the results of the public vote have been processed, the two Nancys with the fewest votes enter a "sing-off". Lloyd Webber then chooses which Nancy from the "sing-off" to save each week. The eliminated Nancy takes the lead in their sing-out medley of "Be Back Soon" and "As Long as He Needs Me".

Finalists

Nancy
Twelve potential Nancys made it through the audition rounds and performed during the live shows. Each Nancy wore a unique coloured dress and a locket. At the end of every live show, the losing Nancy would have the locket stripped off by the Nancy who survived the singoff. In the final, on 31 May 2008, Jodie Prenger was announced as the winner.

* as of the start of the series

Oliver
Twelve potential Olivers made it through the audition rounds and performed in the live shows. Each Oliver was identified with a different coloured scarf, and during the first eight live shows, the Oliver who did best in the mission for that week made it through to the final eight. This Oliver would also receive a hat, and lead vocals in a performance with all the Olivers on the live show. Ultimately, Gwion Jones, Harry Stott and Laurence Jeffcoate were announced as the three winning Olivers in week nine on 24 May.

 as of the start of the series

Results summary
Colour key

Live shows

Week 1 (29/30 March)
Gwion Jones was announced as the first Oliver semi-finalist on the Saturday show.

The show performances and missions were:

Group performances:
Nancys and Olivers: "I'd Do Anything"
Olivers: "Food, Glorious Food"
Nancys: "Sound of the Underground"
Gwion and the Olivers: "Bright Eyes"
Missions:
Nancys: Working in an East End market
Olivers: Learning magic tricks with Paul Kieve

Panel's verdict on who was not Nancy:
John Barrowman: Amy Booth-Steel
Denise Van Outen: Tara Bethan
Barry Humphries: Amy Booth-Steel

Sing-off:

Week 2 (5/6 April)
Chester McKee was announced as the second Oliver semi-finalist on the Saturday show.

The show performances and missions were:
Group performances:
Nancys: "Oom-Pah-Pah"
Olivers: "Electricity" from Billy Elliot the Musical
Nancys: "Enough is Enough"
Chester and the Olivers: "Pie Jesu"
Missions:
Nancys: Facing their fears interacting with rats and acting with Steven Hartley as Bill Sykes
Olivers: Acting class in the West End at Billy Elliot the Musical

Panel's verdict on who was not Nancy:
John Barrowman: Samantha Barks
Denise Van Outen: Keisha Amponsa-Banson
Barry Humphries: Keisha Amponsa-Banson

Sing-off:

Week 3 (12/13 April)
Arthur Byrne was announced as the third Oliver semi-finalist on the Saturday show.

The show performances and missions were:
Group performances:
Nancys: "It's a Fine Life"
Olivers: "Teamwork" from Chitty Chitty Bang Bang
Nancys: "Good Morning Baltimore" from the musical Hairspray
Arthur and the Olivers "A Whole New World" from the film Aladdin
Missions:
Nancys: Losing their inhibitions by performing the love scene from the musical Hairspray with Ben James-Ellis in front of their fathers.
Olivers: Learning teamwork and stamina at Tottenham Hotspur Training Academy with club captain, Robbie Keane.
Theme: Songs from Musicals or Films

Panel's verdict on who was not Nancy:
John Barrowman: Tara Bethan
Denise Van Outen: Keisha Amponsa-Banson
Barry Humphries: Tara Bethan

Sing-off:

Week 4 (19/20 April)
Kwayedza Kureya was announced as the fourth Oliver semi-finalist on the Saturday show.

The show performances and missions were:
Group performances:
Nancys and Olivers: "Consider Yourself"
Olivers: "I Whistle a Happy Tune" from The King and I
Nancys: "Viva Las Vegas"
Kwayedza and the Olivers: "I'll Be There"
Missions:
Nancys: Performing "I'm Not that Girl" from the musical Wicked in front of a West End audience at the Apollo Victoria Theatre
Olivers: Testing their bravery by abseiling
Theme: Las Vegas Divas

Panel's verdict on who was not Nancy:
John Barrowman: Keisha Amponsa-Banson
Denise Van Outen: Keisha Amponsa-Banson
Barry Humphries: Francesca Jackson

Sing-off:

Week 5 (26/27 April)
Alexander Hockaday was announced as the fifth Oliver semi-finalist on the Saturday show.

The show performances and missions were:
Group performances:
Nancys and Olivers: "You've Got to Pick a Pocket or Two"
Olivers: "It's the Hard Knock Life" from Annie
Nancys: "Sisters Are Doin' It for Themselves"
Alexander and the Olivers: "Can You Feel the Love Tonight" from The Lion King
Missions:
Nancys: Testing their physical fitness by rowing and teamwork by then racing in two teams
Olivers: Learning stage fighting

Panel's verdict on who was not Nancy:
John Barrowman: Keisha Amponsa-Banson
Denise Van Outen: Ashley J Russell
Barry Humphries: Keisha Amponsa-Banson

Sing-off:

Notes:
  Before announcing his decision he said, "First, I'm going to say this is a complete and utter travesty, neither of you should be in the bottom two, it's completely wrong. I've been put into a situation that I have never wanted to be in. For the first time on a television show, I am angry." And after choosing to eliminate Keisha, he told her, "You were absolutely wonderful. I think you have a huge career ahead of you and all I can say is that I'll do anything I can to help you."

Week 6 (3/4 May)
Harry Stott was announced as the sixth Oliver semi-finalist on the Saturday show. The Olivers voted to choose one Nancy to perform with them on the Results Show and chose Sarah. Andrew Lloyd Webber worked with each of the Nancys in the week before the show to improve their performance, focusing on their acting abilities. He also gave each Nancy a "master class" to learn the sing-off song.

The show performances and missions were:
Group performances:
Nancys and Olivers: "Who Will Buy?"
Olivers: "Breaking Free" from High School Musical
Nancys: "Fings Ain't Wot They Used T'Be" from the musical of the same name
Sarah, Harry and the Olivers: "Together (Wherever We Go)" from the musical Gypsy
Missions:
Nancys: Improving their acting skills acting a piece from Blood Brothers and improving their cockney accent in an East End pub with actress Barbara Windsor
Olivers: Working with the cast of High School Musical on Stage! learning how to take direction
Theme: Big Band

{| class="wikitable plainrowheaders" style="text-align:center;"
|+ Contestants' performances on the sixth live show
! scope="col" | Act
! scope="col" | Performance Pair 
! scope="col" | Order
! scope="col" | Song
! scope="col" | Result
|- 
! scope="row" | Jodie Prenger
| rowspan="2" | Pair 1
| 1
| "Luck Be a Lady" <small>(from Guys and Dolls")</small>
| Safe
|- 
! scope="row" | Sarah Lark
| style = "background:lightblue"| 2
| style = "background:lightblue"| "Mr. Bojangles" (Sammy Davis Jr.)
| style = "background:lightblue"| Bottom two
|- 
! scope="row" | Rachel Tucker
| rowspan="2" | Pair 2
| style = "background:lightblue"| 3
| style = "background:lightblue"| "For Once in My Life" (Stevie Wonder)
| style = "background:lightblue"| Bottom two
|- 
! scope="row" | Samantha Barks
| 4
| "Sway" (Dean Martin)
| Safe
|-  
! scope="row" | Niamh Perry
| rowspan="1" | Solo Performance 
| 5
| "They Can't Take That Away from Me" (from Shall We Dance)
| Safe
|- 
! scope="row" | Jessie Buckley
| rowspan="2" | Pair 3
| 6
| "The Man that Got Away" (Judy Garland)
| Safe
|- 
! scope="row" | Ashley J Russell
| 7
| "Big Spender" (from Sweet Charity)
| Safe
|- 
|}

Panel's verdict on who was not Nancy:
John Barrowman: Jodie Prenger
Denise Van Outen: Sarah Lark
Barry Humphries: Ashley J Russell

Sing-off:

Notes:

 Andrew Lloyd Webber told Sarah after her elimination, "I have to think as a producer and I do think Rachel was rock solid, and there were moments that I did think that maybe you were a bit fragile", adding "but you were wonderful and you did exactly what I asked."

Week 7 (10/11 May)
Laurence Jeffcoate was announced as the seventh Oliver semi-finalist on the Saturday show. The Olivers voted to choose one Nancy to perform with them on the Results Show and chose Niamh. During the week Lloyd Webber took the Nancys to the O2 Arena to see Celine Dion in concert.

The show performances and missions were:
Group performances:
Nancys: "It's A Fine Life"
Olivers: "You Give a Little Love" from Bugsy MaloneNancys: "Nobody Does It Better" from the film The Spy Who Loved MeNiamh, Laurence and the Olivers: "Chitty Chitty Bang Bang" from the musical of the same name.The Battle of the Nancys – Andrew Lloyd Webber divided the Nancy's by age into two trios to perform two songs:
"The Girls" – Jessie, Niamh and Samantha: "Candyman"
"The Women" – Ashley, Jodie and Rachel: "Man! I Feel Like a Woman!"
Missions:
Nancys: James Bond style mission with John Barrowman, learning theatrical stunts.
Olivers: Visited the Ragged School Museum to learn how strict conditions were in workhouses and worked with actor Todd Carty learning the famous Oliver line, "Please Sir, I want some more."

Panel's verdict on who was not Nancy:
John Barrowman: Jessie Buckley
Denise Van Outen: Ashley J Russell
Barry Humphries: Rachel Tucker

Sing-off:

Notes:
 Lloyd Webber said after the sing off , "I've said Niamh is a little young for this, and I was very hard on you, Ashley," then saying "In the end, I've got to save Niamh." To Ashley he said, "I do want to say that you are a fantastic talent, but you don't communicate it on stage," adding that he would love to work with her one-day, and that her drama students "should be very proud."

Week 8 (17/18 May)
Week eight was the quarter-final stage of the series. Jonny Clowes was announced as the eighth and last Oliver semi-finalist on the Saturday show with Gareth Borrow, Jordan Li-Smith, Joseph McNamara and Sam Cotton leaving after the Saturday show.

The Nancys were joined by five of the finalists from Any Dream Will Do - Daniel Boys, Lewis Bradley, Ben James-Ellis, Keith Jack and Rob McVeigh to perform a group number. They were paired up: Rachel and Daniel; Jodie and Lewis; Jessie and Rob; Samantha and Ben; Niamh and Keith.

The show performances and missions were:
Group performances:
Nancys and Olivers: "Consider Yourself"
 Gareth, Jordan, Joseph, Sam and the Olivers: "Reach"
Josephs and Nancys: "Dancing in the Street"
Jonny and the rest of the Oliver semi-finalists: "I Have a Dream"
Nancys: "I'm Gonna Wash That Man Right Outa My Hair" from the musical South PacificMissions:
Nancys: Learning a comedy routine from Life Coach with comedian Phill Jupitus and Life Coach creator, Nick Reed.
Olivers: Learning the scene from Oliver! where Oliver first meets the Artful Dodger with actor Daniel Barber (Gavroche in Les Misérables).

Panel's verdict on who was not Nancy:
John Barrowman: Jessie Buckley
Denise Van Outen: Niamh Perry
Barry Humphries: Niamh Perry

Sing-off:

Notes:
 After Niamh’s elimination Lloyd Webber said, "Niamh, if I was casting Evita, I would seriously think of you for that role," adding, "Rachel I thought you handled it well, you warmed into the song." Of Niamh he said, "your voice just needs time to mature and I wouldn't be surprised if you weren't up for a major leading role when you're twenty."

Week 9 (24/25 May)
Week nine was the semi-final stage of the series. On 23 May the BBC announced that Cameron Mackintosh would be joining the panel for the semi-final to give his opinion on the four remaining Nancys and to announce, with Lloyd Webber, which three boys they chose as Oliver and that he would also be on the panel for the Grand-final. The four Nancys also appeared on The Paul O'Grady Show on Channel 4 singing "Oom-Pah-Pah".

Gwion Jones, Harry Stott and Laurence Jeffcoate were announced as the three winning Olivers on the Saturday show with Lloyd Webber saying, "Cameron and I agree we have three very different Olivers, but I think it's a great result and I think whichever Oliver you go and see you're going to get a fantastic performance." And Mackintosh adding, "The talent we have unearthed has been terrific."

Cameron Mackintosh confirmed that Rowan Atkinson will be performing the part of Fagin in the stage show. The four remaining Nancys were divided into pairs, The Northern Nancys and the Celtic Nancys for two group performances.

The show performances and missions were:
Group performances:
Nancys and Olivers: "Food, Glorious Food"
The Northern Nancys (Jodie and Samantha): "Superstar" from the rock opera Jesus Christ SuperstarOlivers: "Tomorrow" from the musical AnnieThe Celtic Nancys (Jessie and Rachel): "Buenos Aires" from the musical EvitaAlexander, Arthur, Chester, Jonny and Kwayedza: "No Matter What" from the musical Whistle Down the WindNancys: "A Hard Day's Night" from the Beatles' film of the same name
Gwion, Harry and Laurence: "Where is Love?"
Missions:
Nancys: A character building "Stepping back in time" task getting to grips with what life was like for Nancys spending time in an authentic Victorian home and speaking Nancy's love ballad, "As Long as He Needs Me" in front of Barry Humphries.
Olivers: Performing as Oliver in a West End theatre singing "Where is Love?" with advice from actor Jon Lee.

Panel's verdict on who was not Nancy:
John Barrowman: Jessie Buckley
Denise Van Outen: Jessie Buckley
Barry Humphries: Jodie Prenger
Cameron Mackintosh: Jodie Prenger

Sing-off:

Notes:

 Andrew Lloyd Webber expressed severe disappointment with the result, saying "Last night Cameron and I were both saying that we thought both of you would be fantastic Nancys and now here am I faced with this. But I've got to make a decision and I've got to think of where the show ultimately for Cameron is going to go and I think I have to go with you Samantha.

In the week following the show, it was claimed that Andrew Lloyd Webber and Cameron Mackintosh had fallen out over Lloyd Webber's decision to eliminate Rachel Tucker who Mackintosh had wanted to see in the final. Lloyd Webber said, "The fact is Cameron wanted Rachel to stay. He wanted Rachel and Samantha in the final from the beginning of the series. Rachel did a fantastic performance but I had to face up to the fact that she wouldn't have gone any further. What I may think professionally is sometimes different from what the public want. I saved Rachel three times and she still ended up in the bottom two."

In the week the semi-final aired, the four semi-finalists did a photoshoot for Now magazine recreating some of Madonna's iconic images. Jodie posed in a wedding dress to recreate the cover of the album Like a Virgin; Jessie copied a pose, wearing a black dress, from the music video for the song Like a Prayer, Samantha was dressed in hotpants copying the pose from the cover of the 2008 album, Hard Candy and Rachel posed in a cowboy hat, recreating the cover of the album Music.

Week 10 (31 May)
Week ten was the final week of the show and the Grand-final when the winning Nancy was revealed. Both shows aired live on Saturday with the main show starting at 6:00pm and the Results show at 8:45pm. The finalists were Jessie Buckley, Jodie Prenger and Samantha Barks.

On 30 May, Andrew Lloyd Webber revealed that Cameron Mackintosh was concerned about Jodie Prenger's "curvaceous figure" saying, "Cameron thinks she is a bit too big and has more or less said so". However, Webber defended Prenger, saying that she had both the vocal talents and personality for the role, saying "Jodie could be anybody's idea of Nancy - I can see it absolutely. She has got a lovely voice and a super personality. She has experience as well."

Also on 30 May, the BBC announced how voting would work in the final. With all the decisions now being from the public vote, the voting lines opened at the start of Show One. At the end of Show One, the finalist with the lowest number of viewers votes, Samantha was eliminated and therefore finished third. The voting lines then re-opened to vote for the series winner, with all the votes cast for the remaining two Nancys carried over. Then in Show Two the final two Nancys went head-to-head before the winner was announced as Jodie.

The three finalists were taken to Paris in the week leading up to the show. In London they met and had a "Master Class" with Liza Minnelli. All twelve Nancy finalists and all twelve Oliver finalists also performed. Lee Mead also performed on Show One. In Show two both Jessie and Jodie performed Nancy's love ballad "As Long as He Needs Me".

The show performances were:
Group performances:
Nancys and Olivers*: "I'd Do Anything" (all twelve Nancy and all twelve Oliver finalists)
Laurence and Jodie: "Getting to Know You" from the musical The King and IHarry and Samantha: "Singin' in the Rain" from the film Singin' in the RainGwion and Jessie: "Truly Scrumptious" from the musical Chitty Chitty Bang BangJessie, Jodie and Samantha "Maybe This Time" from the film CabaretLee Mead and the Olivers "Any Dream Will Do" from the musical Joseph and the Amazing Technicolor DreamcoatFormer Olivers and Nancys: "Never Forget"
Theme: Emotional Showstoppers

Theme: Winning song, song of the series

Judges' verdicts on who was Nancy:
John Barrowman: Jodie Prenger
Denise Van Outen: Jodie Prenger
Barry Humphries: Jessie Buckley
Cameron Mackintosh: Jessie Buckley
Andrew Lloyd Webber: Jessie Buckley
The Final Vote
The final vote was then announced and it was revealed that the winner was Jodie Prenger with Andrew Lloyd Webber saying, "The people's Nancy. Jodie was always going to be the people's choice." Cameron Mackintosh added, 'I'm thrilled for Jodie, congratulations!'

Reception
In March 2008, the BBC drew criticism from American actor, Kevin Spacey, the artistic director of the Old Vic Theatre Company for airing shows such as I'd Do Anything and Any Dream Will Do which he claimed were distorting the theatre market in favour of musicals instead of straight plays. Spacey said, "I felt that was essentially a 13-week promotion for a musical - where's our 13-week programme?" and that he thought the BBC's talent shows were "crossing the line" and "unfair". The BBC responded that it "always reflected" other West End shows in its talent programmes. Adding that the shows were not unduly promotional and that the shows "celebrate musical theatre generally, not just one West End show". They also pointed out that the BBC had no commercial interest in the West End productions of Oliver!, Joseph and the Amazing Technicolor Dreamcoat or The Sound of Music.

Spacey's comments were criticised by Simon Cowell who stated, "It sounds like Russia in the Sixties, that mentality. I don't think that applies to the modern world. What the BBC does is very good for the West End because it reminds millions of people what the West End is all about – they're going to sell a lot of tickets off the back of that."

On 31 May 2008 it was revealed that the show regularly received over 6 million viewers. The first programme of the series which aired on 15 March, before the first live shows two weeks later, was watched by 5.5 million viewers, 24.2% of the total audience, in what the Entertainment and Media website Digital Spy described as "a weak debut".

After the week five shows it was revealed that the Saturday show was watched by 5.6 million viewers, 27% of the total audience, which although 0.5 million down on the previous week, was still 200,000 above the slot average. This was slightly ahead of the third episode of All Star Mr & Mrs, on ITV1 which had 5.2 million viewers (25.2%).

The final shows on 31 May were shown on the same night as the finals of the second series of Britain's Got Talent on ITV1 although the shows did not clash directly apart from a short period toward the end of Show one of I'd Do Anything. The total number of viewers for both shows was given as 20 million.

 Ratings 
Ratings taken from BARB.

Later series
Lloyd Webber next returned to BBC screens in 2010 with a similar series, Over the Rainbow, a search to find a new Dorothy for The Wizard of Oz'', produced by his company, The Really Useful Group.

References

External links

Official Oliver! The Musical website 

BBC Television shows
British reality television series
Singing talent shows
2008 British television series debuts
2008 British television series endings
Oliver Twist